Charles Louis Napoléon d'Albert (25 February 1809 – 26 May 1886) was a dance master and composer of ballets and popular dance music. He was the father of Romantic-era virtuoso pianist Eugene d'Albert and an ancestor of Giuseppe Matteo Alberti and Domenico Alberti.

Biography
D'Albert was born in Nienstedten, near Hamburg, on the Elbe River. His father was François Benoit d’Albert, a cavalry captain in the French Army and aide-de-camp to General Bernard-Georges-François Frère. His mother was Chretienne Sophie Henriette (Schultz) of Hamburg, an accomplished musician, gave him his first instruction, exposing him to Mozart, Haydn, and Beethoven. After his father died at the Battle of Waterloo in 1816, he and his mother emigrated to England.

Career
D'Albert reportedly studied piano with Friedrich Kalkbrenner, who was in London between 1814–23, and composition with Samuel Sebastian Wesley in London. He received dance instruction first in London and then at the Paris Conservatoire. After completing his studies in Paris, he returned to London, taking up the post of Dancing Master at the King's Theatre and Covent Garden. During that time, he wrote the libretto for the Adolphe Adam's Adolphe Adam ballet-pantomime La jolie fille de Grand, and created the role of the Marquis de San Lucar.

By 1835, D'Albert had left London for Newcastle-on-Tyne, establishing his own dance school and composing dance music. There, he published Ballroom Etiquette (1835). His first success as a composer of popular dances was the "Bridal Polka" in 1845. His most popular tune was "The Sultan's Polka". All of his music was published by Chappell & Co.

After a successful career, he and his wife moved to London in 1876. He continued to compose and promote his son's career as a virtuoso pianist and composer. Charles D'Albert died on 26 May 1886 and was buried in Kensal Green Cemetery.

Personal life
Charles D'Albert married Annie Rowell, a Newcastle school teacher, in 1863. The following year, during an annual teaching trip to Scotland, Annie gave birth to Eugen D'Albert.

References

1809 births
1888 deaths
19th-century German male musicians
German Romantic composers
German male classical composers
British classical composers
German emigrants to England
1886 deaths